The Toybox is a 2018 American supernatural horror film directed by Tom Nagel and starring Mischa Barton and Denise Richards. The film wrapped production in April 2017 and was then acquired by CineTel Films with an aim of launching sales at both the 2017 Cannes Film Festival and the American Film Market. A promotional trailer was released on April 4, 2018. The film was also accepted into a coveted screening slot at the Texas Frightmare Weekend in May 2018. The film was released in theaters and on VOD on September 18, 2018. Entertainment Weekly released the exclusive trailer on August 17, 2018.

Plot
Jennifer (Richards) and her family go on a summer road trip in a used RV with her husband's estranged father and brother. Along the way, they find Samantha (Barton) and her brother, broken down on the side of the highway. After driving into the middle of nowhere, the RV takes on a mind of its own, crashing and stranding them in the scorching and isolated desert. Little by little, the unsuspecting group of travelers is blindsided by the terrible secrets within the walls of the RV and find themselves fighting to survive.

Cast
 Mischa Barton as Samantha
 Denise Richards as Jennifer
 Matt Mercer as Mark
 Katie Keene as Ghost Girl
 Carolyne Maraghi as Mary
 Jeff Denton as Steve
 Brian Nagel as Jay

Reception 
On Rotten Tomatoes the film has an approval rating of  based on reviews from  critics.

References

External links
 Official website
 

2018 films
2018 horror films
American supernatural horror films
American horror thriller films
CineTel Films films
2018 horror thriller films
2010s supernatural films
Films set in deserts
2010s English-language films
2010s American films